The Mbéré River is a river in Cameroon and Chad.  It forms part of the border of the Central African Republic.  It is a tributary of the Logone River.

References

Rivers of Cameroon
Rivers of Chad
Rivers of the Central African Republic
International rivers of Africa